Circolo Canottieri Ortigia, also known as Ortigia Siracusa, is an Italian water polo club from Syracuse established in 1928. It is currently best known for its women's team, which won two LEN Trophies in 2004 and 2005.

Titles
 Men: 
 COMEN Cup (2)
 2000, 2001
 Women: 
 LEN Trophy (2)
 2004, 2005

References

External links 
 Official website

Water polo clubs in Italy
Sport in Syracuse, Sicily
Sports clubs established in 1928